Massilia norwichensis is a Gram-negative and rod-shaped bacterium from the genus Massilia which has been isolated from air from the Sainsbury Centre for Visual Arts in Norwich in England.

References

External links
Type strain of Massilia norwichensis at BacDive -  the Bacterial Diversity Metadatabase

Burkholderiales
Bacteria described in 2015